Rudolf of Habsburg may refer to:

 Rudolf I of Germany (1218–1291), King of the Romans
 Rudolph II, Count of Habsburg (d. 1232)
 Rudolf II, Duke of Austria (1270–1290)
 Rudolf I of Bohemia (1281–1307), Duke of Austria and Styria and King of Bohemia
 Rudolf IV, Duke of Austria (1339–1365) 
 Rudolf II, Holy Roman Emperor (1552–1612), King of Hungary, King of Bohemia, Archduke of Austria and Holy Roman Emperor
 Archduke Rudolf of Austria (1788–1831),  Cardinal and Archbishop of Olmütz
 Rudolf, Crown Prince of Austria (1858–1889)